Rubén Priede (born 8 June 1966) is an Argentine former cyclist. He competed in the team pursuit event at the 1988 Summer Olympics.

References

External links
 

1966 births
Living people
Argentine male cyclists
Olympic cyclists of Argentina
Cyclists at the 1988 Summer Olympics
Place of birth missing (living people)
Pan American Games medalists in cycling
Pan American Games silver medalists for Argentina
Medalists at the 1987 Pan American Games
20th-century Argentine people